Gashland is a neighborhood of Kansas City, Missouri, United States.

Gashland has the name of Joseph D. Gash, first landowner of the site. A post office called Gashland was established in 1899, and remained in operation until 1959.

References

Neighborhoods in Kansas City, Missouri